This is a list of meteorology topics. The terms relate to meteorology, the interdisciplinary scientific study of the atmosphere that focuses on weather processes and forecasting. (see also: List of meteorological phenomena)

A 
 advection
 aeroacoustics
 aerobiology
 aerography (meteorology)
 aerology
 air parcel (in meteorology)
 air quality index (AQI)
 airshed (in meteorology)
 American Geophysical Union (AGU)
 American Meteorological Society (AMS)
 anabatic wind
 anemometer
 annular hurricane
 anticyclone (in meteorology)
 apparent wind
 Atlantic Oceanographic and Meteorological Laboratory (AOML)
 Atlantic hurricane season
 atmometer
 atmosphere
 Atmospheric Model Intercomparison Project (AMIP)
 Atmospheric Radiation Measurement (ARM)
 (atmospheric boundary layer [ABL]) planetary boundary layer (PBL)
 atmospheric chemistry
 atmospheric circulation
 atmospheric convection
 atmospheric dispersion modeling
 atmospheric electricity
 atmospheric icing
 atmospheric physics
 atmospheric pressure
 atmospheric sciences
 atmospheric stratification
 atmospheric thermodynamics
 atmospheric window (see under Threats)

B 
 ball lightning
 balloon (aircraft)
 baroclinity
 barotropity
 barometer ("to measure atmospheric pressure")
 berg wind
 biometeorology
 blizzard
 bomb (meteorology)
 buoyancy
 Bureau of Meteorology (in Australia)

C 
 Canada Weather Extremes
 Canadian Hurricane Centre (CHC)
 Cape Verde-type hurricane
 capping inversion (in meteorology) (see "severe thunderstorms" in paragraph 5)
 carbon cycle
 carbon fixation
 carbon flux
 carbon monoxide (see under Atmospheric presence)
 ceiling balloon ("to determine the height of the base of clouds above ground level")
 ceilometer ("to determine the height of a cloud base")
 celestial coordinate system
 celestial equator
 celestial horizon (rational horizon)
 celestial navigation (astronavigation)
 celestial pole
 Celsius
 Center for Analysis and Prediction of Storms (CAPS) (in Oklahoma in the US)
 Center for the Study of Carbon Dioxide and Global Change (based in Arizona in the US)
 (Central America Hurricane of 1857: see) SS Central America (Ship of Gold)
 Central Florida Tornado of February 2007
 Certified Consulting Meteorologist
 chaos theory (see "butterfly effect" under Chaotic dynamics)
 (Chapman cycle: see) ozone-oxygen cycle
 chemtrail theory
 Chicago Climate Exchange (CCX)
 chinook wind (see "inversion smog" under Chinooks and health)
 Henry Helm Clayton
 clear-air turbulence (CAT)
 climate
 climate change
 Climate Diagnostics Center (in the US)
 climate engineering
 (climate forcing: see) radiative forcing
 Climate Group
 climate house
 climate model
 climate modeller
 Climate Monitoring and Diagnostics Laboratory (CMDL) (in the US)
 Climate Outreach and Information Network (COIN) (British charity)
 (climate parameters, forcings and feedbacks: see) parametrization (climate)
 Climate Prediction Center (CPC)
 (climate science: see) climatology
 climate sensitivity
 (climate simulation: see) climate model
 climate surprise
 (climate techno-fix: see) climate engineering
 (climate theory: see) Charles de Secondat, Baron de Montesquieu (see "climate theory" in paragraph 3 under Political views)
 (climate variability: see) climate change
 (climate warming: see) global warming
 (climate weapon: see) Weather modification (see under In the military)
 climateprediction.net (CPDN) (distributed computing project)
 climatic determinism (equatorial paradox) (see also environmental determinism)
 Climatic Regions of India
 Climatic Research Unit (at the University of East Anglia in the UK)
 (climatic zone: see) clime
 climatology
 clime (climatic zone)
 Clinton Foundation (see under Clinton Climate Initiative (CCI))
 cloud
 cloud albedo ("a measure of the reflectivity of a cloud")
 cloud base ("the lowest altitude of the visible portion of a cloud")
 cloud chamber (Wilson chamber) ("for detecting ... ionizing radiation")
 cloud condensation nuclei (CCNs) (see under Phytoplankton role)
 cloud cover
 cloud feedback
 cloud forcing (see "greenhouse effect" in paragraph 2)
 cloud forest
 (cloud formation: see) nephology
 cloud physics
 cloud seeding
 cloud street
 cloud suck
 cloudburst (see "destruction" in paragraph 2 and see "Mumbai" in paragraph 3)
 CloudSat ("a NASA environmental satellite")
 coefficient of haze (in meteorology)
 cold-core low
 cold weather boot
 cold weather rule (cold weather law) (for public utility companies)
 (coldest place on earth: see) climate of Antarctica (see under Temperature)
 coldest temperature achieved on Earth
 Colorado low
 Community Climate System Model
 continental climate
 contrail
 controlled airspace
 controlled atmosphere (for agricultural storage)
 convection (see under Atmospheric convection)
 convective available potential energy (CAPE) (in meteorology)
 convective condensation level (CCL)
 convective inhibition (CIN)
 convective instability
 convective temperature (Tc)
 Cooperative Institute for Atmospheric Sciences and Terrestrial Applications (CIASTA)
 Cooperative Institute for Arctic Research
 Cooperative Institute for Climate and Ocean Research (CICOR)
 Cooperative Institute for Climate Applications and Research (CICAR)
 Cooperative Institute for Climate Science (CICS)
 Cooperative Institute for Limnology and Ecosystems Research (CILER)
 Cooperative Institute for Marine and Atmospheric Studies (CIMAS)
 Cooperative Institute for Mesoscale Meteorological Studies (CIMMS)
 Cooperative Institute for Meteorological Satellite Studies (CIMSS)
 Cooperative Institute for Precipitation Systems (CIPS)
 Cooperative Institute for Research in Environmental Sciences (CIRES)
 Cooperative Institute for Research in the Atmosphere (CIRA)
 corona (meteorology)
 COSMIC (Constellation Observing System for Meteorology, Ionosphere, and Climate)
 Cosmic Anisotropy Telescope (CAT)
 Cosmic Background Explorer (COBE) ("to investigate the cosmic background radiation" etc.)
 cosmic microwave background experiments
 cosmic microwave background radiation (CMB) (CMBR) (CBR) (MBR)
 cosmic noise
 cosmic ray (see under Lightning)
 Cosmochemical Periodic Table of the Elements in the Solar System
 cosmochemistry
 cumulonimbus cloud (see under Effects)
 (cumulonimbus with mammatus: see) mammatus cloud
 (cumulonimbus with pileus: see) pileus (meteorology)
 cumulus castellanus cloud
 cumulus cloud
 cumulus congestus cloud
 cumulus humilis cloud
 cumulus mediocris cloud
 (cup anemometer: see) anemometer (see under Cup anemometers)
 current solar income
 cyclogenesis
 cyclone
 cyclone furnace (a type of coal combustor)
 (cyclone preparedness: see) hurricane preparedness
 cyclonic separation (method of removing particles from an air or gas stream)

D 
 D region (in the atmosphere)
 Darrieus wind turbine
 dawn
 dBZ (meteorology)
 degree (temperature)
 deicing
 dendroclimatology ("extracting past climate information from information in trees")
 density altitude
 Denver Convergence Vorticity Zone (DCVZ)
 deposition (physics)
 (depression [meteorology]: see) low pressure area
 derecho (see also List of derecho events)
 dew
 dew point (dewpoint, Td)
 dew point depression
 disdrometer
 downwelling
 drizzle
 drought
 dry-bulb temperature
 dry line (dew point line)
 dry punch
 dry season
 dusk

E 
 Earth's atmosphere
 Earth's magnetic field
 Earth System Research Laboratory (ESRL)
 economics of global warming
 Emagram
 effect of Hurricane Katrina on New Orleans (see also Hurricane Katrina effects by region)
 effect of sun angle on climate
 Enhanced Fujita scale (EF scale)
 eolian processes
 equator (see under Equatorial seasons and climate)
 equilibrium level (EL)
 equivalent potential temperaturбe
 equivalent temperature
 European Centre for Medium-Range Weather Forecasts (ECMWF)
 European Climate Change Programme (ECCP)
 European emission standards (for motor vehicles)
 European Severe Storms Laboratory (ESSL)
 European windstorm
 evaporation
 evaporative cooler
 evaporative cooling
 evaporite (a mineral sediment resulting from evaporation of saline water)
 evapotranspiration (ET) (sum of evaporation and plant transpiration)
 exhaust gas recirculation (EGR) (exhaust gas recycling)
 exosphere (layer of atmosphere)
 extratropical cyclone (mid-latitude cyclone)
 extreme weather
 extremes on Earth

F 
 fire whirl
 firestorm
 fog
 forensic meteorology
 free convective layer (FCL)
 freezing rain
 (front [meteorology]: see) surface weather analysis
 frontogenesis
 frontolysis
 frost
 frost creep (frost heave)
 frost flowers (frost castles) (ice castles) (ice ribbons) (ice blossoms)
 frost heaving (frost heave)
 frost law
 frost line
 (frost point: see) dew point (dewpoint)
 frostbite
 Fujita scale (F scale) (for measuring tornadoes)
 fulgurite
 (full lunar eclipse: see) lunar eclipse
 full-spectrum light
 funnel cloud (related to a tornado)

G 
 galactic cosmic ray (GCR)
 gale
 gale warning
 Galileo thermometer (Galilean thermometer)
 Galveston, Texas (see under Hurricane of 1900 and recovery)
 Galveston Hurricane of 1900 (in the US)
 gas balloon (see under History)
 gas flare (flare stack)
 (gas warfare: see) chemical warfare
 Geophysical Fluid Dynamics Laboratory (GFDL)
 glossary of climate change
 glossary of environmental science
 glossary of tornado terms
 glossary of tropical cyclone terms
 glossary of wildfire terms
 gustnado

Ge-Gk 
 geomagnetic storm
 (geomagnetism: see) Earth's magnetic field
 geospatial technology (Spatial Information Technology)
 Geostationary Operational Environmental Satellite (GOES) (a program of the US)
 geostatistics
 geostrophic wind
 Global Atmosphere Watch (GAW)
 Global Forecast System (GFS)
 global warming
 greenhouse effect
 greenhouse gas (GHG)
 growing degree day (GDD)
 growing season
 gust front

H 
 hail
 halo (optical phenomenon)
 haze
 heat
 (heat budget: see) radiation budget
 (heat equator: see) thermal equator
 (heat lightning: see) lightning
 heat wave
 heating degree day (HDD)
 (Heaviside layer) Kennelly–Heaviside layer (E region) (in the atmosphere)
 Heavy snow warning
 heliostat
 High Frequency Active Auroral Research Program (HAARP)
 high pressure area
 High Resolution Fly's Eye Cosmic Ray Detector
 high-altitude airship (HAA)
 hodograph
 humid continental climate
 humid subtropical climate
 (humidex) heat index (HI)
 humidity
 HurriQuake nail (for resisting hurricanes and earthquakes)
 (hydrologic cycle) water cycle
 hydrological phenomenon
 hydrology
 hydrosphere
 hygrometer (different from hydrometer)
 hypercane ("hypothetical class of hurricane")

I 
 ice
 Ice Accretion Indicator
 ice age
 ice storm
 Ice Storm Warning
 illuminance
 impact winter
 impluvium
 in situ (see under Earth and atmospheric sciences)
 incidental radiator
 India Meteorological Department
 Indian summer
 infrared (IR) radiation (see under Meteorology)
 insolation
 instrument meteorological conditions (IMG)
 instrumental temperature record
 intentional radiator
 International Meteorological Organization (IMO)
 International Temperature Scale of 1990 (ITS-90)
 International Terrestrial Reference System (ITRS)
 inversion
 Invest (meteorology)
 ion wind (ion wind) (coronal wind)
 ionosonde (chirpsounder)
 ionosphere
 ionospheric reflection
 ionospheric sounding
 iron cycle
 irradiance
 irradiation
 isobar
 isochore (in a thermodynamic diagram)
 isodrosotherm
 isogon (meteorology)
 (isogram) contour line (level set) (isarithm)
 isohel
 isohume
 isohyet
 isohypse (in topography)
 isotherm

K 
 katabatic wind

L 
 Laboratory for Atmospheric and Space Physics (LASP)
 lake effect snow (a snowsquall)
 (lake surge: see) storm surge
 land hemisphere
 land lighthouse
 landspout
 lapse rate
 Lemon technique
 lenticular cloud
 level of free convection (LFC)
 life zone
 lifted condensation level (LCL)
 lifted index (LI)
 lightning
 lightning detection
 lightning prediction system
 lightning rod (lightning protector) (lightning finial)
 lightning safety
 (lightning storm) thunderstorm (T-storm) (electrical storm)
 lightvessel (lightship)
 line echo wave pattern (LEWP)
 line source ("a source of air, noise, water contamination or electromagnetic radiation")
 (list of all-time high and low temperatures by state: see) U.S. state temperature extremes
 list of basic earth science topics
 list of Category 5 Atlantic hurricanes
 list of Category 5 Pacific hurricanes
 list of cloud types
 list of coastal weather stations of the United Kingdom
 list of countries by carbon dioxide emissions
 list of countries by carbon dioxide emissions per capita
 list of Earth observation satellites
 list of lighthouses and lightvessels
 list of meteorological phenomena
 list of most polluting power stations
 list of named tropical cyclones
 list of Northern Indian Ocean tropical cyclone seasons (see also :Category:North Indian cyclone seasons)
 List of derecho events
 list of notable tropical cyclones
 list of power outages
 list of scientific journals in earth and atmospheric sciences
 list of Solar Cycles (list of sunspot cycles)
 list of tornado-related deaths at schools
 list of weather instruments
 list of weather records
 Little Ice Age (LIA)
 Local storm report
 low pressure area (see same for "low-pressure cell")
 (lowest elevations: see) list of places on land with elevations below sea level
 (luminous pollution) light pollution (photopollution)
 lunar phase

M 
 Madden–Julian oscillation (MJO)
 magnetic storm (geomagnetic storm)
 magnetopause
 magnetosheath
 magnetosphere
 marine west coast climate (maritime climate) (oceanic climate)
 Mars Climate Orbiter
 Mars Radiation Environment Experiment (Martian Radiation Experiment) (MARIE)
 maximum parcel level (MPL)
 maximum sustained wind 
 Max Planck Institute for Meteorology (MPI-M)
 mean radiant temperature (MRT)
 Mediterranean climate
 medium Earth orbit (MEO) (intermediate circular orbit) (ICO)
 megathermal (macrothermal)
 melting
 mercury (element) (see "Clean Air Act" under United States)
 mercury-in-glass thermometer
 mesopause
 mesoscale convective complex (MCC)
 mesoscale convective system (MCS)
 mesoscale convective vortex (MCV)
 mesoscale meteorology
 mesocyclone
 mesohigh
 mesolow
 mesonet
 mesosphere
 mesothermal (in climatology)
 mesovortex
 Met Office (previously Meteorological Office) (the UK's national weather service)
 meteorological history of Hurricane Katrina
 Meteorological Service of Canada (MSC)
 meteorology
 metrology
 Miami Tornado (of May 12, 1997)
 Miami tornadoes of 2003
 microclimate
 microscale meteorology
 Mid-Atlantic United States flood of 2006
 middle latitudes
 midnight
 millimeter cloud radar (millimeter wave cloud radar) (MMCR)
 misoscale meteorology
 mist
 mixed layer
 mixing ratio
 moisture
 molecular-scale temperature
 moonlight

N 
 NASA Clean Air Study
 NASA Earth Observatory
 NASA World Wind (virtual globe)
 National Ambient Air Quality Standards (NAAQS) (in the US)
 National Center for Atmospheric Research (NCAR) (in the US)
 National Centers for Environmental Prediction (NCEP) (in the US)
 National Climatic Data Center (NCDC) (in the US)
 National Emissions Standards for Hazardous Air Pollutants (NESHAPS) (in the US)
 (National Environmental Satellite, Data and Information Service: see) National Oceanic and Atmospheric Administration (NOAA) (in the US)
 National Geomagnetism Program (in the US)
 National Hurricane Center (NHC) (in the US)
 National Map (in the US)
 National Oceanic and Atmospheric Administration (NOAA) (in the US)
 (National Severe Storms Forecast Center [NSSFC]: renamed) Storm Prediction Center (SPC) (in the US)
 National Severe Storms Laboratory (NSSL) (in the US)
 National Snow and Ice Data Center (NSIDC) (in the US)
 National Solar Observatory (in the US)
 National Weather Association (NWA) (in the US)
 National Weather Center (NWC) (in the US)
 National Weather Service bulletin for New Orleans region (at 10:11 a.m., August 28, 2005)
 National Weather Service (NWS)
 nautical almanac
 nephology
 nephoscope
 night sky
 nimbus cloud
 nitrogen cycle
 (nitrogen pollution: see) eutrophication (see under Atmospheric deposition)
 NOAA Weather Radio All Hazards (NWR) (of the US)
 noctilucent cloud
 North Atlantic tropical cyclone
 North Pole
 numerical weather prediction

O 
 observational astronomy (see "light pollution" in places)
 observatory (see also list of observatories)
 ocean heat content (OHC)
 Ocean Prediction Center (OHC)
 occultation
 oceanic climate
 Office of Oceanic and Atmospheric Research (OAR)
 1999 Oklahoma tornado outbreak
 orographic lift
 outflow boundary
 oxygen
 oxygen cycle
 ozone
 ozone depletion
 ozone depletion potential (ODP)
 ozone layer (ozonosphere layer)
 ozone-oxygen cycle

P 
 Pacific decadal oscillation
 paleoclimatology
 paleomagnetism
 paleotempestology
 parts-per notation
 photovore
 planetary boundary layer (PBL)
 pluvial lake
 pneumonia front
 polar circle
 polar climate
 polar easterlies
 polar high
 polar ice cap
 (polar light: see) aurora (astronomy)
 polar low
 (polar mesospheric cloud) noctilucent cloud
 polar mesospheric summer echoes (PMSE)
 polar night
 polar region
 (polar reversal) magnetic polarity reversal
 polar stratospheric cloud (PSC) (nacreous cloud)
 polar vortex
 Polarization (waves) (see under Polarization effects in everyday life)
 pole shift theory
 positive streamer
 post-glacial rebound
 potential evaporation
 potential temperature
 precipitation
 pressure gradient
 pressure gradient force (PGF)
 pyrocumulus

Q 
 Quantitative precipitation estimation
 Quantitative precipitation forecast
 Quasi-geostrophic equations

R 
 radiance
 radiant barrier
 radiant energy
 radiation
 radiation budget
 radiation hormesis
 radiation poisoning (radiation sickness)
 radiative cooling
 radiative forcing
 radiological weapon (radiological dispersion device [RDD])
 radiosonde
 radius of outermost closed isobar
 rain
 rain fade (fading of signal by rain or snow)
 rain gauge
 rain sensor
 rain shadow
 rainbow
 rainforest
 rarefaction
 RealClimate (commentary site on climate science)
 RealSky (digital photographic sky atlas)
 relative humidity
 relative pressure
 (relief precipitation: see) orographic lift
 research balloon
 resistance thermometer (resistance temperature detector) (RTD)
 rime (frost)

S
 Saffir-Simpson Hurricane Scale
 satellite temperature measurements
 (Sea Islands Hurricane) 1893 Sea Islands Hurricane
 sea level
 (sea level pressure) atmospheric pressure
 sea surface temperature (SST)
 severe weather
 severe weather terminology (United States)
 Skew-T log-P diagram
 sky
 skyglow
 smoke
 snow
 Solar and Heliospheric Observatory
 solar azimuth angle
 solar cell
 solar collector
 solar constant
 solar cycle
 solar eclipse
 solar flare (see under Hazards)
 solar furnace
 solar greenhouse (technical)
 solar heating
 solar maximum
 Solar Maximum Mission
 solar minimum
 solar mirror
 solar proton event
 solar radiation (solar irradiance)
 (solar storm) geomagnetic storm
 solar thermal collector
 solar thermal energy
 solar updraft tower
 solar variation
 solar wind
 solarium
 space geostrategy (astrostrategy) (geostrategy in space)
 Space Science and Engineering Center (SSEC)
 space weather
 (specific humidity: see) humidity (see under Specific Humidity)
 squall
 squall line
 (standard atmospheric pressure) atmospheric pressure (standard atmosphere)
 standard conditions for temperature and pressure
 storm
 storm cellar
 storm chasing
 storm drain (storm sewer) (stormwater drain)
 storm-scale
 storm surge
 storm tide
 storm track
 storm warning (see same for "storm watch")
 storm scale
 stormwater
 stratopause
 stratosphere
 Stüve diagram
 subarctic
 subarctic climate
 subtropical cyclone (see same for "subtropical depression" and for "subtropical storm")
 subtropics (see same for "subtropical" and for "subtropical climate")
 sudden ionospheric disturbance (SID)
 sudden stratospheric warming
 sun
 sun dog (sundog) (parhelion)
 sunlight
 sunshower
 sunspot (see under "Significant events")
 supercell
 surface temperature inversion
 surface weather analysis
 surface weather observation
 synoptic scale meteorology

T
 teleconnection
 temperature
 temperature extremes
 (temperature inversion) inversion (meteorology)
 temperature record
 temperature record of the past 1000 years
 tephigram
 The Weather Channel (TWC)
 The Weather Network
 thermal equator
 thermodynamic temperature
 thermometer
 thunder
 thundersnow
 thunderstorm (electrical storm)
 TIMED (Thermosphere Ionosphere Mesosphere Energetics and Dynamics)
 TOR
 tornado
 tornado climatology
 tornado intensity
 tornado warning
 tornado watch
 tornado emergency
 tornadogenesis
 torr (symbol: Torr) (millimetre of mercury) (mmHg)
 Total Ozone Mapping Spectrometer (TOMS)
 tropical climate
 tropical cyclogenesis
 tropical cyclone (tropical storm) (typhoon) (hurricane)
 Tropical Cyclone Formation Alert (TCFA)
 tropical cyclone observation
 tropical cyclone prediction model
 tropical cyclone rainfall climatology
 tropical cyclone scales
 Tropical Ocean-Global Atmosphere program (TOGA)
 tropical rain belt
 Tropical Rainfall Measuring Mission (TRMM)
 Tropical Rainforest Heritage of Sumatra (in Indonesia)
 (Tropical Research Institute) Smithsonian Tropical Research Institute (STRI) (in Panama)
 Tropical upper tropospheric trough (TUTT)
 tropical wave (African easterly wave)
 tropopause
 troposphere
 Tropospheric Emission Spectrometer (TES)
 tropospheric ozone
 tsunami
 Tsunami PTSD Center (Tsunami Post Traumatic Stress Disorder Center)
 tsunami warning system
 typical meteorological year

U 
 U.S. state temperature extremes
 ultraviolet
 United States temperature extremes
 urban heat island (UHI)
 UV index

V 
 vapor pressure
 virtual temperature
 vorticity

W 
 waterspout
 water vapor
 weather
 weather forecasting
 weather front
 weather lore
 Weather Modification Operations and Research Board (US)
 Weather Prediction Center (WPC)
 weather radar
 weather satellite
 wet-bulb potential temperature
 wet-bulb temperature
 wind
 wind chill
 wind direction
 wind gradient
 wind profiler
 wind shear
 wind speed
 windcatcher
 Windscale fire
 winter storm
 Winter Storm Warning
 Winter Weather Advisory
 World Asthma Day
 World Climate Change Conference, Moscow
 World Climate Conference
 World Climate Programme
 World Climate Report
 World Climate Research Programme
 World Meteorological Organization (WMO)
 World Solar Challenge

Z 

 Zonal wavenumber

 
Meteorology topics

ca:Fenomen meteorològic
de:Portal:Wetter und Klima/Themenliste
fr:Glossaire de la météorologie
id:Fenomena meteorologi
nl:Weer en klimaat van A tot Z
nn:Vêrfenomen